Dominique "Dom" Guinard is the CTO of EVRYTHNG. He is a technologist, entrepreneur and developer with a career dedicated to building the Internet of Things both in the cloud and on embedded Things. He is particularly known for his early contributions to the Web of Things along with other researchers such as Vlad Trifa, Erik Wilde and Friedemann Mattern. Guinard is a published researcher, a book author and a recognized expert in Internet of Things technologies

Career

Guinard studied Computer Science at Université de Fribourg and graduated with a master's degree in computer science with a minor in business administration. During his studies he also worked at and co-founded several startups (Spoker, Dartfish, GMIPSoft), taught computer science and software developed at several private and public schools.

Guinard began working on the Internet of Things in 2005 with Sun Microsystems working on RFID applications. He continued studying the field with his a master's thesis at Lancaster University on Ubiquitous Computing. After graduating from university, he went on to get his PhD in Computer Science at ETH Zurich. During his time as a PhD he also worked as a Research Associate for SAP where he met Vlad Trifa. Both focused on the Internet of Things applications at SAP especially looking at the integration of real-world devices such as wireless sensor networks to business processes and enterprise software (e.g., ERPs).

The complexity of these integrations at the time lead them to look for simpler integration mechanisms. In 2007 they defined an application layer for the Internet of Things that uses Web standards called the Web of Things and founded the Webofthings.org community to promote the use of Web standards in the IoT. Guinard wrote his Ph.D thesis on the Web of Things, particularly looking at the physical mashups of Things on the Web. His thesis was granted an ETH Medal in 2012
. Towards the end of his Ph.D worked applying the Web of Things concepts to Smart Supply chains and IoT applications in manufacturing environments at the MIT Auto-ID Lab with Professor Sanjay Sarma.

In 2011, Guinard co-founded EVRYTHNG together with Vlad Trifa, Niall Murphy and Andy Hobsbawm. The founding idea of EVRYTHNG was to create digital identities and Web APIs for all kinds of objects: from consumer goods to consumer electronics. As such, EVRYTHNG was the first commercial Web of Things platform. Dominique has been the CTO of EVRYTHNG since then, overseeing all the technical aspects of the platform.

In 2015, Guinard co-authored the Web Thing Model which was accepted as an official W3C member submission. The Web Thing model is a first attempt at creating a simple Web based standard for the application layer of the Internet of Things.

Publications

Guinard published a number of scientific articles in journals and conferences

covering many aspects of the Internet of Things and the Web of Things. One of his most cited publications is "Towards the Web of Things: Web Mashups for Embedded Devices" which lays the foundations for integrating everyday devices and sensors to the Web.

Guinard co-authored a number of books

related IoT and in particular "Building the Web of Things". This book was the first to provide an applicable step-by-step guide about how to implement Web-based smart products and applications using Node.js and the Raspberry Pi.

References

Living people
ETH Zurich alumni
Swiss computer scientists
Internet of things
1981 births